Shyamchi Mummy is a 2008 two-act Marathi play by Ashok Patole and directed by Purshottam Berde. The cast includes Nirmiti Sawant, Purnima Ahire, Anant Chauhan, Purshottam Berde, Manohar Gaikwad.

This is a comedy play about the current education system taking a toll on students. The play is about various efforts taken by a mother to see that her son gets a good score on an exam. It is occasionally shown on Zee Talkies during the Tisri Ghanta programme.

Synopsis
Yashoda Borkar (Nirmiti Sawant) works at a bank and is married to a singer/music director Anand Borkar (Satish Tare), who in unsuccessful in both of his careers. They have a teenage son in 11th grade and Yashoda insists that he focus on his education as she wants him to become a doctor.

Their neighbors' son always gets better grades than Shyam even though he participates in sports.

Cast
 Nirmiti Sawant
 Purnima Ahire
 Anant Chauhan
 Purshottam Berde
 Manohar Gaikwad
 Bhushan Kadu

Crew
Director - Purshottam Berde

References

External links
 'Play Detail'
 
 'Official Youtube'

Indian plays
Postmodern plays
Marathi-language plays